The Zee Cine Award (ZCA) is an Indian awards ceremony for the Hindi film industry. They were instituted in November 1997 to award "Excellence in cinema - the democratic way".

They were first held in Mumbai until 2004, when the ZCA went international and had their ceremony in Dubai, and in following years in London, Mauritius, Malaysia, and London again in 2008. It was not held in 2009 and 2010; due to TV release of Dance India Dance, but resumed in 2011, being held in Singapore in 2012 it was held at the CotaiArena in Macao.

The 2018 edition was held at MMRDA Grounds, Mumbai.

It was also not held in 2021 due to COVID-19 pandemic.

Awards 
Viewer's choice

 Best Film
 Best Actor
 Best Actress
 Song of the Year

Jury's choice

 Best Film
 Best Director
 Best Actor
 Best Actress
 Best Actor in a Supporting Role
 Best Actress in a Supporting Role
 Best Villain
 Best Comedian
 Most Promising Director
 Best Male Debut
 Best Female Debut
 Best Male Playback Singer
 Best Female Playback Singer
 Best Music Director
 Best Lyricist
 Lifetime Achievement
 Face of the Year

Technical Awards

 Best Background Music
 Best Dialogue
 Best Story
 Best Screenplay
 Best Cinematography
 Best Editing
 Best Action
 Best Art Direction
 Best Audiography
 Best Choreography
 Best Costumes
 Best Processing
 Best Publicity
 Best Song Recording
 Best Visual Effects

See also 
 Hindi cinema
 Cinema of India

References 

Zee Cine Awards
Awards established in 1998